New Lenox is a commuter train station along Metra's Rock Island District line in New Lenox, a southern suburb of Chicago, Illinois. It is also the penultimate station along the RID line before reaching the end of the line at Joliet Transportation Center. In Metra's fare-based system, New Lenox station is in zone G. As of 2018, New Lenox is the 49th busiest of Metra's 236 non-downtown stations, with an average of 1,046 weekday boardings.

As of 2022, New Lenox is served by 21 trains in each direction on weekdays, by 10 inbound trains and 11 outbound trains on Saturdays, and by eight trains in each direction on Sundays.

New Lenox station was originally built by the Chicago, Rock Island & Pacific Railroad in 1900. It is located just north of US 30, and is also west of a bridge that carries a former Wabash Railroad line that serves Metra's SouthWest Service line. There are no convenient transfers between these two stations. Like Laraway Road station, no bus connections are currently available.

Tracks
There are two tracks at New Lenox. Trains from Chicago run on track 2 (the north track) and trains to Chicago run on track 1 (the south track.)

References

External links

Station House from Google Maps Street View

Metra stations in Illinois
Former Chicago, Rock Island and Pacific Railroad stations
Railway stations in the United States opened in 1900
Railway stations in Will County, Illinois